Lemon Joy is a Lithuanian synthpop band formed in Vilnius in 1994, consisting of Igoris Kofas (vocals), Olegas Semionovas (guitar, keyboards) and Rytis Rutkauskas (drums).

Biography 
Lemon Joy, originally called "Этаж-3", was founded in 1994 by four Russian–Lithuanians Igoris Kofas, Olegas Semionovas, Maksimas Bambras and Sergėjus Grėjus. In 1996, the band was renamed to "Lemon's Joy" and soon played its first concert along with another emerging Lithuanian rock band Airija in Kaunas. During its early years, Lemon's Joy music focused on the gothic rock/alt rock sound, whose basis became distorted guitar riffs and prominent bass line combined with Igoris's emotional, dreamy lyrics.

The band won the so–called Baddest Groups' Festival in 1996 with their song "City of Berries", which had become a number one hit the same year in "Ultra Vires", one of the first commercial radio stations in independent Lithuania. Later that year, the band participated in the Roko Maršas, a Lithuanian music festival dedicated to rock music.

Up until the Roko Maršas, Lemon's Joy primarily played songs written in English; they decided to play their first Lithuanian single "Glostyk" during the festival and later released an album under the same name, winning a Bravo trophy (equivalent of the Grammy) for best first album.

In 1997, the band participated in "Rock Summer" music festival in Tallinn. The following year, the group was renamed to its current name and began to focus on electronic music after bassist Sergėjus Grėjus left the band.

In 2006, the group released its fifth studio album titled 1210, which was well–received by Lithuanian audiences and reached top positions in Lithuanian charts.

In 2011, the group released its seventh album titled "Stebuklas", whose Italo-disco single Kažkada topped the charts in several Lithuanian radio stations.

In November 2016, Lemon Joy released its latest album "Willkommen".

Image 
Despite the band's focus on electronic music production, Lemon Joy often uses electric guitars and drum kits on–stage to add a rock'n'roll element to their performances. Igoris is also known for his flashy costumes, accessories and blonde dyed hair.

Albums

References 

Lithuanian rock music groups
Musical groups established in 1994
1994 establishments in Lithuania
Music in Vilnius
Lithuanian synthpop groups